Marko Ivanović (born July 24, 1962) is a Serbian professional basketball executive and former player. He is currently serving as the general manager for Borac Čačak of the Basketball League of Serbia.

Post-playing career 
Ivanović was the general manager for Hemofarm from 2003 to 2011. Since 2012, he has been the general manager for Borac Čačak.

References

External links
 Basketball.eurobasket.com

1962 births
Living people
Basketball League of Serbia players
KK Beobanka players
KK Borac Čačak players
KK Partizan players
Apollon Patras B.C. players
KK Budućnost players
KK Hemofarm players
BC Levski Sofia players
Serbian basketball executives and administrators
Serbian men's basketball players
Serbian expatriate basketball people in Bulgaria
Serbian expatriate basketball people in Greece
Serbian expatriate basketball people in Montenegro
Serbian expatriate basketball people in North Macedonia
Power forwards (basketball)
Universiade medalists in basketball
Universiade silver medalists for Yugoslavia
Medalists at the 1983 Summer Universiade